Cyclone is an unincorporated community in Bell County, in the U.S. state of Texas. According to the Handbook of Texas, the community had a population of 45 in 2000. It is located within the Killeen-Temple-Fort Hood metropolitan area.

History
The community was first recognized when Czech families settled in the area sometime before 1883. A post office was established at Cyclone in 1886 and remained in operation until 1906. Local legend has it that the community was named Cyclone because one settler said that "it would take a cyclone to get this bunch together" when they had a meeting to decide on a name. There were 75 residents and a general store in the community in 1890. Two years later, the community built a mill and gin. Its population zenith was 102 in 1904. There were four businesses in operation as late as 1948. There was a blacksmith shop and a grocery store alongside a population of 80 residents and several scattered homes in the mid-1960s. The blacksmith shop closed, and the population dropped to 55 in 1968. It went down to 45 from 1990 through 2000. In the early 21st century, the community's store remained in operation under the name Cyclone Corral.

Geography

Education
In 1903, Cyclone had a school with 42 students and one teacher. Today, the community is served by the Rogers Independent School District.

References

Czech communities in the United States
Unincorporated communities in Texas
Unincorporated communities in Bell County, Texas